Fasiha Hassan is a South African lawyer, politician and previous student activist. Hassan was a SRC leader during the FeesMustFall protests at the University of the Witwatersrand. She was a law student at the time. At the age of 25 in May 2019, she became the youngest Member of the Gauteng Provincial Legislature. Hassan is a member of the African National Congress (ANC).

References

External links
Fasiha Hassan – People's Assembly

Living people
Year of birth missing (living people)
African National Congress politicians
Members of the Gauteng Provincial Legislature
People from Gauteng
University of the Witwatersrand alumni